Denis Hugh Cameron (born 17 November 1938) is a New Zealand former rugby union player. Cameron played 8 games in the position of wing three-quarter for the All Blacks in 1960.

References 

1938 births
New Zealand rugby union players
Living people
People educated at Ashburton College
Rugby union wings
Rugby union players from Ashburton, New Zealand